The 2020 British Superbike Championship season was the 33rd British Superbike Championship season.  Because of a late season start caused by the global pandemic, all races were run behind closed doors and the playoff was abolished.

Teams and riders

All entries used Pirelli tyres.

Race calendar and results

Championship standings

Riders' championship

Scoring system
Points are awarded to the top fifteen finishers. A rider has to finish the race to earn points.

References

External links

British Superbike Championship
Superbike Championship
British Superbike Championship